Farranferris was a secondary school in Cork City, Ireland. It opened in 1887, closed in 2006, and was an important institution in the twentieth century history of the city.

History

Saint Finbarr’s Seminary
At the time of the Penal Laws Irishmen who wanted to study to become priests had to travel overseas and many of them went to France (Cork, for example, had close links with colleges in Bordeaux and Toulouse). French colleges were closed down after the French Revolution and this caused a drop in the supply of priests to Irish parishes. In 1795 St Patrick's College, Maynooth was opened to provide for the education of Catholic priests in Ireland and that same year the Bishop of Cork set up a post-primary preparatory seminary in Ballyvolane House (near present-day Ellis's Yard), it was to prepare boys for Maynooth and other seminary colleges.

The residential seminary in Ballyvolane House closed after a short time and in 1813 the Bishop of Cork established Saint Mary's Seminary across the road from the North Cathedral. A recession associated with the Napoleonic Wars closed Saint Mary's after eight years. Cork's next preparatory seminary would be set up by the Vincentians in 1845, it would occupy a building that had previously been the Lord Mayor's Mansion House (now Mercy Hospital) for twelve years before moving to a vacant school building located at Saint Patrick's Place (in the red-brick building where Cork's 96FM is based now). The Patrick's Place building did not have facilities for boarders.

In September 1876, the Bishop of Cork took control of the Saint Patrick's Place seminary and renamed it Saint Finbarr's Seminary. The first president of Saint Finbarr's was Fr. J.J. Coughlan. In April 1881 the church acquired Carrollina House in Montenotte so Saint Finbarr's could function as a residential seminary for pupils who wished to become priests (Carrollina, which was situated where the Ardnalee housing estate now stands, was named by John Carroll in 1770s, he was a great grand-nephew of Charles Carroll). At the beginning there were fourteen students in residence in Carrollina.

Farranferris 
The idea for a new purpose built residential seminary school was raised immediately on the founding of Saint Finbarr's. In 1881 a bequest of £1200 from a Miss O’Driscoll set things in motion and from 1883 to 1885 a new college was built at Farranferris on the northside of the city (Farranferris – land of Ferris, supposedly Ferris was an old English landlord in the area). It was constructed by E. P. O'Flynn at a cost of £17,000 to designs by Samuel Francis Hynes (it is listed in the National Inventory of Architectural Heritage as a "fine and imposing example of late Victorian ecclesiastical architecture in the Gothic Revival style"). Two workers were killed in an accident during its construction.

The new college opened in September 1887; the pupils who had lived in Carrollina moved to the new dorms and the old classrooms at Saint Patrick's Place were handed over to the Christian Brothers (who founded a new school in its place).

At the time Farranferris was being built the Bishop of Cork, William Delany, was infirm with old age and most of his duties, including the driving forward of the college, were being carried out by Henry Neville. Before the college opened, Delany died (to be replaced by Thomas A. O'Callaghan), and Neville was moved on. Dr. John B. O’Mahony was President of Farranferris for its first twenty years.

Becoming a day school 
Dr. Patrick Sexton became the president of Farranferris in 1907; at the time the college had about 20 students, all of whom were intending to become priests in time (there was no entrance exam, a candidate only needed a testimonial from his parish priest to be admitted). A short time after he took over Sexton decided that Farranferris should accept day pupils for outside students. The first of these boys began classes in September 1909.

In 1916, the Bishop of Cork, Thomas A. O'Callaghan, died and was replaced by Daniel Cohalan; Cohalan was the first bishop of Cork who had previously passed through Farranferris as a student.

At the time Cohalan was appointed bishop, World War I was well underway and several Cork priests were on the Western Front; amongst them were two Farranferris priests Fr. Joe Scannell MC and Archdeacon T. F. Duggan MC.

In the autumn of 1922 one of the teachers as Farranferris, Patrick MacSwiney did a favour for his cousin Mary and took charge of a bag for a friend whose premises were in danger of being raided by government forces. Fr. MacSwiney did not examine the contents and deposited the bag in the Clifton convent in Montenotte (where he was chaplain). The convent was raided shortly afterwards, the bag was discovered and found to contain £3,000. It was rumoured that this was part of the £100,000 that had been robbed by republican forces from the Customs House in Dublin and that the priest had abused the nuns' trust by hiding the stolen money in the convent on behalf of Mary MacSwiney. The incident led to Fr. MacSwiney being removed from his clerical duties in Cork and sent to Dunmanway.

In the summer of 1923 the Great War veteran Fr. Joe Scannell replaced Patrick Sexton as President of Farranferris (Sexton would later become a parish priest at St. Patrick's and was instrumental in building St Patrick's School, Cork).

In his first year as president, Joe Scannell introduced an entrance exam for Farranferris, the newspaper notice advertising the new regime stated that pupils were being prepared for "the professions (the Church, Medicine, Law, Engineering, Primary and Secondary Training, etc.), Government Appointments, Commercial and Industrial Purposes".

Mid-to-late 20th century 
The Golden Jubilee (fiftieth anniversary) of Farranferris college was celebrated in 1937. At the time it had 120 students.

In February 1938, Fr. Denny Murphy was made President of Farranferris.

In December 1945 T. F. Duggan, a former British Army Chaplain who had been a POW in WW1 and had won a medal for gallantry in WW2, was made President of Farranferris.

In June 1954, Fr. Daniel Luke Connolly was made President of Farranferris.

In 1960, St Finbarr's College, Farranferris was expanded (to the designs of James Boyd Barrett) to provide extra schoolroom accommodation and it began to take non-seminary boarders.

In September 1962, Fr. Carthach McCarthy was made President of Farranferris.

In 1969, Fr. Michael Murphy (later Bishop of Cork and Ross) was made President of Farranferris.

In 1976, Fr. John Buckley (later Bishop of Cork and Ross) was made President of Farranferris.

In July 1983, Fr. Micheál O Dálaigh was made President of Farranferris.

The centenary of the Farranferris was celebrated in 1987.

When uniforms were introduced Farranferris adopted a wine-coloured jumper with grey shirt and trousers.

Final decades 

Fr. Noel O'Sullivan was President of Farranferris in 1996.

Farranferris closed to boarding pupils at the end of the 1999–2000 academic year.

Fr. Aidan O'Driscoll was President of Farranferris when it closed in 2006.

Sports

The school was successful at hurling, having won the Dr. Harty Cup and Dr. Croke Cup on several occasions.

Literature
 Walsh, Fr. J. C.: Farranferris: The Heritage of St Finbarr 1887-1987. Tower Books, Cork 1987.
 Horgan, T.: Farna's Hurling Story, Publisher: St. Finbarr's Seminary, Farranferris, 1996

Notable pupils and staff 
 Daniel Cohalan, Bishop of Cork
 Patrick Coveney, Archbishop, Apostolic Nuncio, 1960-66 member of College staff
 Timothy Smiddy, Ireland's first Ambassador/Overseas Minister
 Aloys Fleischmann, Composer, Cathedral Organist and Choirmaster
 
 Patrick MacSwiney, Priest, Gaelic Scholar, Antiquarian, Historian and Teacher
 Seán Hyde, Revolutionary and Hurler
 Air Chief Marshal Sir Francis Fogarty, a senior commander in the Royal Air Force (RAF) during the Second World War
 Michael Joseph Sheehan, Brigadier in the British Army (service during World War I and World War II) 
 Cornelius Lucey, Bishop of Cork/Bishop of Cork and Ross
 Dinny Barry-Murphy, Hurler
 Aloys Fleischmann Jnr., Composer
 Daniel Costigan, Commissioner of An Garda Síochána
 James Young, Hurler and Gaelic Footballer
 Christy Ring, Hurler (Coached at Farranferris)
 Joe Kelly, Hurler
 Jerome Kiely, Poet
 John A. Murphy, Historian
 Paddy Barry, Hurler
 Seán Ó Riada, Composer and founder of Ceoltóirí Chualann
 Michael O Brien, Hurling Coach and Hurling Manager
 Terry Kelly, Hurler
 Bill O'Herlihy, Broadcaster
 John Buckley, Bishop of Cork and Ross
 Denis O'Riordan, Hurler
 Joe Walsh, Politician
 Seánie Barry, Hurler
 Donal "Donie" Collins, Hurler
 Francis Collins, Hurler
 Pat Barry, Hurler
 Tim Crowley, Hurler
 Tadhg Murphy, Hurler and Footballer
 Johnny Crowley, Hurler
 Finbar Wright, Singer
 John Minihan, Politician
 John Kevin Coleman, Hurler and Politician 
 Kieran Kingston, Hurler and Hurling Manager
 Tom Kingston, Hurler
 Jerry Buttimer, Politician
 Liam Twomey, Politician
 Mark Foley, Hurler 
 Kevin Murray, Hurler
 Mark Prendergast, Hurler
 Tom Kenny, Hurler 
 Paul Tierney, Hurler 
 John Gardiner, Hurler
 Shane Murphy, Hurler
 Donal O'Mahony, Hurler and Hurling Manager

References

Secondary schools in County Cork
Educational institutions established in 1887
1887 establishments in Ireland
Educational institutions disestablished in 2006
2006 disestablishments in Ireland